Moricambe Bay is an inlet of the Solway Firth in Cumbria (before 1974 in Cumberland) in north west England, created by the confluence of two rivers, the Waver and Wampool. To the south is the town of Silloth, and to the north the Anthorn radio station near Cardurnock.

External links 

Cumberland
Landforms of Cumbria
Bays of England
Solway Firth